Ilona Novák (16 May 1925 – 14 March 2019) was a Hungarian swimmer and Olympic champion. She competed at the 1948 Olympic Games in London, where she finished 4th in 100 m backstroke and 5th in 4 × 100 m freestyle relay. At the 1952 Olympic Games in Helsinki she received a gold medal in 4 × 100 m freestyle relay as captain of the Hungarian team.

She was inducted into the International Swimming Hall of Fame in Fort Lauderdale, Florida in 1973, together with her sister, Éva Novák.

See also
 List of members of the International Swimming Hall of Fame
 List of Olympic medalist families

References

External links
 
 
 
 
 

1925 births
2019 deaths
Swimmers from Budapest
Hungarian female backstroke swimmers
Olympic swimmers of Hungary
Swimmers at the 1948 Summer Olympics
Swimmers at the 1952 Summer Olympics
Olympic gold medalists for Hungary
World record setters in swimming
Hungarian female freestyle swimmers
Medalists at the 1952 Summer Olympics
Olympic gold medalists in swimming
20th-century Hungarian women
21st-century Hungarian women